Inauini River is a river of Amazonas state in north-western Brazil, a tributary of the Purus River.

The Inauini River forms the boundary between the Mapiá-Inauini National Forest and the Purus National Forest.
The local people have complained that many people come up the Inauini by boat and fish in nearby lakes.
The intruders also collect turtles, which has led to a sharp drop in the turtle population.

See also
List of rivers of Amazonas

References

Sources

Rivers of Amazonas (Brazilian state)